Mix 106.3 (call sign: 1CBR) is a commercial radio station in Canberra, Australia and is owned by the Australian Radio Network and Southern Cross Austereo.

Mix 106.3 plays current hits and a variety of 1970s, 1980s and 1990s music (Hot Adult Contemporary), primarily targeted at the 35+ age group. The station is affiliated to the Southern Cross Austereo Triple M network, and is sold to national advertisers in the KIIS network.

Kristen and Nige for breakfast started in 2018, with existing host Kristen Henry teaming up with long-time friend and experienced presenter Nigel Johnson. The new show is #1 in Canberra, according to the latest 2019 survey.

History
KIX 106, as it was then known, and sister station FM104 (now HIT 104.7) were Australia's first supplementary FM licences, as well as being the first new commercial FM radio stations licensed in Australia since 1980. KIX 106 was a supplementary licence of Canberra AM station 2CC, and FM104 a supplementary licence of AM station 2CA.

The station officially opened at 8am on 27 February 1988, with an inaugural broadcast hosted by Frank Fursey. Dennis Clairs was on air noon-pm and Peter Mobbs 6pm-midnight with the KIX Party Mix. KIX carried an iconic eagle mascot, using 'the eagle' as a nick-name for the station. On its first weekend of programme KIX offered 10-in-a-row 'music sweeps', focusing on a teenage audience.

Six years after launch, station manager Steven Pead announced Capital City Broadcasters would re-brand to focus on an older demographic, having finished fifth in eight consecutive ratings surveys. On 12 February 1994, the station became as 'the new' 106.3 Canberra FM and would follow a similar 'soft' format to Melbourne's TTFM.

In 1997, due to flat advertising conditions bought about by Commonweal public sector cuts, ARN - owner of Mix 106.3 & 2CC, and Austereo - owner of 104.7 & 2CA, formed a joint venture ownership of both FM stations - Canberra FM Pty Ltd. The AM stations were sold off, and are currently operated by a joint-venture between Capital Radio Network and Grant Broadcasters.

On-Air
Current lineup

 Kristen & Nige – 6–9am Weekdays
 Nige106.3 – 9–10am Weekdays
 Workdays with Pat – 10am–3pm Weekdays
 Bronte & Wilko – 3–6pm Weekdays
 Wrapped with Tamara & Rod 6–7pm Weekdays
 The Christian O'Connell Show – 7–8pm Weekdays
 Jonesy & Amanda – 8–9pm Weekdays
 The Super Serious Sports Show – 9–10pm Monday & Thursday
 The Cam and Renee Show – 8–9am Saturday
 The Real Estate Show – 9–10am Saturday
 Life Uncut Radio Show – 10am–12pm Saturday
 Raiders on Mix – Live coverage of the Canberra Raiders NRL matches

News Team

 Lewis Haskew (News Director)
 Kate Rice
 Renee Bogatko
 Samantha Rose

News
The station operates a highly successful newsroom which it shares with sister station hit104.7, providing a 7-day news service offering comprehensive coverage of news from the Canberra region and around the globe.

Studios
Both Mix 106.3 and Hit 104.7 broadcast their studio complex in Bellenden Street, Crace. The broadcast range of the channel is focused to Canberra and some neighbouring regions extending as far as Yass in the North (55 km from Canberra CBD), Tharwa in the South (30 km from Canberra CBD) and Bungendore in the East (40 km from Canberra CBD).

References

External links
 Official Mix 106.3 website

Radio stations in Canberra
Radio stations established in 1988
Adult contemporary radio stations in Australia
Australian Radio Network
Southern Cross Media Group